Phaedymia (or Phaedyme, Phædima) was the daughter of Otanes, a Persian noble mentioned in the Histories of Herodotus. She was married in turn to Cambyses II, Gaumata (False Smerdis) and Darius I.

References
Histories of Herodotus, Book 3, 3.69

6th-century BC women
Women of the Achaemenid Empire
6th-century BC Iranian people
Cambyses II
Remarried royal consorts